The Joseph Ross House is a historic house located at 5200 Passfield Road in Rochester, Illinois. Joseph Ross built the two-story Italianate house in 1868. The brick house has an "L"-shaped plan with a low hip roof. Two porches run along the house, one at the front entrance and one along the rear ell. A bracketed and dentillated cornice, the house's main decorative feature and a key element of the Italianate style, encircles the roof line. The house is the best-preserved brick Italianate house in the Rochester vicinity.

The house was added to the National Register of Historic Places on March 2, 2006.

References

Houses on the National Register of Historic Places in Illinois
Italianate architecture in Illinois
Houses completed in 1868
National Register of Historic Places in Sangamon County, Illinois
Houses in Sangamon County, Illinois